Shahar Mozes (שחר מוזס) is an Israeli mathematician.

Mozes received in 1991, his doctorate from the Hebrew University of Jerusalem with thesis Actions of Cartan subgroups under the supervision of Hillel Fürstenberg. At the Hebrew University of Jerusalem, Mozes became in 1993 a senior lecturer, in 1996 associate professor, and in 2002 a full professor.

Moses does research on Lie groups and discrete subgroups of Lie groups, geometric group theory, ergodic theory, and aperiodic tilings. His collaborators include Jean Bourgain, Alex Eskin, Elon Lindenstrauss, Gregory Margulis, and Hee Oh.

In 2000 Mozes received the Erdős Prize. In 1998 he was an invited speaker with talk Products of trees, lattices and simple groups  at the International Congress of Mathematicians (ICM) in Berlin. He was a plenary speaker at the ICM Satellite Conference on "Geometry Topology and Dynamics in Negative Curvature" held at the Raman Research Institute of the International Centre for Theoretical Sciences (ICTS) from August 2 to August 7, 2010.

Selected publications

References

External links
 (ICTS Conference, August 2010 — Mozes describes joint work with Bourgain, Furman, and Lindenstrauss.)

Living people
Israeli mathematicians
Hebrew University of Jerusalem alumni
Academic staff of the Hebrew University of Jerusalem
Year of birth missing (living people)
Erdős Prize recipients